George Raymond Kinley (June 4, 1937 – February 23, 2022) was an American politician in the state of Iowa and a business co-founder and owner.

Biography
Kinley was born in Akron, Ohio. He moved with his family to Des Moines, Iowa, and graduated from Dowling Catholic High School in Des Moines. Kinley graduated from Drake University, in 1960, with a bachelors degree in sociology. Kinley was a successful business owner of Kinley's Golf Sales in Des Moines, Iowa, for over 60 years. He served in the Iowa State Senate from 1973 to 1992, and in the Iowa House of Representatives from 1971 to 1973, as a Democrat.

Death
He died on February 23, 2022, at the age of 84.

References

1937 births
2022 deaths
Businesspeople from Akron, Ohio
Politicians from Akron, Ohio
Businesspeople from Des Moines, Iowa
Politicians from Des Moines, Iowa
Drake University alumni
Democratic Party Iowa state senators
Democratic Party members of the Iowa House of Representatives